The 1995 Moscow Ladies Open singles was a tennis tournament played on indoor carpet courts at the Olympic Stadium in Moscow in Russia that was part of 1995 Moscow Ladies Open. The tournament was held from September 18 through September 23, 1995.

Magdalena Maleeva was the defending champion and won in the final 6–4, 6–2 against Elena Makarova.

Seeds
A champion seed is indicated in bold text while text in italics indicates the round in which that seed was eliminated.

  Magdalena Maleeva (champion)
  Helena Suková (first round)
  Sabine Appelmans (quarterfinals)
  Kristie Boogert (first round)
  Silvia Farina (first round)
  Åsa Carlsson (quarterfinals)
  Elena Makarova (final)
  Elena Likhovtseva (quarterfinals)

Draw

External links
 1995 Moscow Ladies Open Draw

1995 WTA Tour
1995 in Russian women's sport
1995 in Russian tennis